Ketagodage Dona Ranmini Chethana Ketagoda (born 4 August 1992), popularly as Chethana Ketagoda, is an actress in Sri Lankan television as well as a voice artist. One of the most popular voice artists in Sri Lanka with a career spanning 18 years, she rendered her voice to several popular international soap operas and serials. Apart from that, she is also a singer, investor, agriculturalist, digital content creator on social media platforms as well as an Attorney-at-Law by profession.

Personal life
She was born on 4 August 1992 in Colombo as the second child of the family. Her father K. D. Upali Chandrathilake, is a retired Air Vice Marshall of Sri Lanka Air Force. Her mother, Indika P. Chandrathilake, is an Attorney-at-Law and a government official. She completed education from Visakha Vidyalaya, Colombo up to grade 9 and then completed O/Ls from Royal Institute International School, Havelock. In the 2009 Edexcel IGCSE examination at Royal Institute, she became the “World’s Best” in Sinhala. She has one elder sister, who is a doctor and an Air Force officer.

After studies, she completed LLB degree in University of London and became an Attorney-at-Law. Besides, she also completed her BA degree in Hindi Language from Indira Gandhi National Open University, India. Currently, she is working as a lecturer in Hindi Language.

Career
At very young age, she joined with Sri Lanka Rupavahini Corporation and started appearing on several child programs. In 2003, she became a voice artist under the guidance of popular actress Mercy Edirisinghe. She made her maiden dubbing for the cartoon Kaabaasiniya Thuma under Athula Ransirilal. Meanwhile, in 2008, she started singing career.

At the same time, she started to act in few stage dramas at Tower Hall Foundation. In 2008, she made her first television role in the serial Madam Shobha directed and produced by Jayasekara Aponso. Meanwhile, she rendered her voice to several popular international soap operas and serials including; Sooriya Diyani, Mayawarunge Lokaya, Swapna, Praveena, Me Adarayai, Prema Dadayama and Boys Over Flowers. In 2010, she made the music in the film Behind the Scenes directed by Lakpathy Wijesekara.

In 2020, she appeared in the television serial Bro directed by Dilan Wickramakeerthi and produced by Gayan Dinesh Perera. In the serial, she played the character 'Bilesha'. In 2021, she made her third television role 'Dinu' in the television serial Snap directed by Pasindu Perera and Produced by Ameesha Kavindi.

Selected radio dramas
 Araliya Man Aadarei (2009) 
 Aadarei Man Samanalee (2013) 
 Sihina Sittarawi (2018)
 Maharaja Gamunu (2018)
 Kemmura Adaviya (2019) 
 Apoorva (2020)

Dubbing works

| 2021 || Hotel Transylvania || Hotel Transylvania || Mavis Dracula-Loughran
|-

Television serials

References

External links 
 
https://t.me/chethanack
 Chethana Ketagoda on Twitter

1992 births
Living people
Sri Lankan television actresses
Sri Lankan television personalities
Sri Lankan radio personalities
Voice actresses